Luso-Indians or Portuguese-Indian, is a subgroup of the larger multiracial ethnic creole people of Luso-Asians. Luso-Indians are people who have mixed varied Indian subcontinent and European Portuguese ancestry or people of Portuguese descent born or living or originating in former Portuguese Indian colonies, the most important of which were Goa and Daman of the Konkan region in the present-day Republic of India (formerly British India), and their descendants/ diaspora around the world, the Anglosphere, Lusosphere, Portuguese East Indies etc. Luso-Asians of the Indian subcontinent are primarily from Velha Goa, Damaon, Dio district, St Mary's islands of Mangalore, Bombay (Mumbai), Korlai (Chaul), Vasai (Bassein), Silvassa, Cape Comorin, Fort Cochin etc. There are also a number of New Christian Brahmins and Christian Cxatrias with Portuguese surnames, but do not necessarily possess European ancestry, being named as such in the process of their religious conversion to Western Christianity by Portuguese missionaries in the sixteenth century. This was done to prevent discrimination among the native converts. Nevertheless, they are in many cases indistinguishable from the wider Luso-Indian population.

History

Early history

In the 16th Century, a thousand years after the collapse of the Western Roman Empire, the Portuguese became the first European power to begin trading in the Indian Ocean. They were in South India a few years before the Moghuls appeared in the North. In the early 16th century, they set up their trading posts (factories) throughout the coastal areas of the Indian and Pacific Oceans, with their capital in Goa in South West India on the Malabar Coast.

In 1498, the number of Europeans residents in the area was merely a few tens of thousands. By 1580, Goa was a sophisticated city with its own brand of Indo-Portuguese society. Early in the development of Portuguese society in India, the Portuguese Admiral Afonso de Albuquerque encouraged Portuguese soldiers to marry native women and this was termed as Politicos dos casamentos.

The Portuguese also shipped over many Órfãs do Rei to Portuguese India, Goa in particular. Órfãs do Rei literally translates to "Orphans of the King", and they were Portuguese girls sent to overseas territories to marry either Portuguese settlers or natives with high status.

Some Portuguese explorers expressed a disdain for their existence, Parson Terry, writing in 1616 stated that "The truth is that the Portuguese, especially those who are born in the Indian colonies, most of them a mix'd seed begotten upon the natives, are a very low, poor-spirited people, called therefore the Gallinas Del Mar, the hens of the sea!"

Arrival of other Europeans

The English, French and Dutch East India Companies became active in Far East trading in a meaningful way about a hundred and fifty years after the Portuguese. They too set up their posts throughout the Indian Ocean. By the middle of the 17th century there were several thousand Portuguese and Luso-Indians in India and a relatively small population of other Indian-Europeans. By the end of the 17th century, the East India Companies had established three major trading posts in India – Fort St. George (Chennai), Fort St William (Kolkata) and Bombay Island. In 1670, the Portuguese population in Madras numbered around 3000.

Portuguese speaking communities in Republic of India

Korlai

Korlai is central to a small thriving community of Indo-Portuguese Christians, settled for nearly 500 years on the western coast of India at Chaul near Mumbai. This is one of the only unique 16 century Portuguese speaking community in India today, where the language has over the decades metamorphosed to Korlai Portuguese creole, a variant mix of the 16th century Portuguese & local Indian languages. The Portuguese left Korlai & Chaul around 1740 & the language also survived due to Portuguese speaking priests, as the priestly diocese was under Goa till early 1960s. It has vigorous use and it is also known as Kristi ("Christian"), Korlai Creole Portuguese, Korlai Portuguese, or Nou Ling ("our language" in the language itself). The small surviving community of a 1600 strong population is an excellent specimen of the cultural diversity, integrity and the extensive trade links of historical India. The place also boasts to be an area where Christian, Hindus, Muslims & Jews have been living together in harmony since centuries within the same region & yet proudly relate themselves as Indians today.

Goa

Goa was the capital of Portuguese India from 1530 and was called "Rome of the East". The Luso-Goans came into existence following intermarriages between the Portuguese soldiers and native Goan women in the aftermath of the Portuguese conquest of Goa in 1510. Luso-Goans spoke Konkani and Portuguese with the present generation also speaking English, and write Konkani in the Roman script. Portuguese was the language of overseas province governance, however it is now Portuguese still spoken as a first language only by a minority of Goans, restricted to upper-class Catholic families and the older generation. However, the annual number of Goans learning Portuguese as a second language has been continuously increasing in the 21st century. The last newspaper in Portuguese ended publication in 1980s (i.e. O Heraldo switched from Portuguese to English overnight in the mid Eighties). However, the "Fundação do Oriente" and the Indo–Portuguese Friendship Society (Sociedade de Amizade Indo-Portuguesa) are still active. Many signs in Portuguese are still visible over shops and administrative buildings in Goan cities like Panjim, Margão and Vasco da Gama. After the Indian annexation of Goa, the Indian government has changed the Portuguese names of many places and institutes. There is a department of Portuguese language at the Goa University and the majority of Luso-Goan students choose Portuguese as their third language in schools. Luso-Goans have a choice to either be fully Portuguese citizens or fully Indian citizens or fully Portuguese citizens with an OCI (Overseas citizenship of India) granted by the Indian nationality law.

Those Luso-Goans of noble descent have a well-documented family history and heritage recorded and maintained in various archives in Portugal and Goa. During the absolute monarchy, Luso-Goan nobles enjoyed the most privileged status in Goa and held the most important offices. With the introduction of the Pombaline reforms in the 1750s and then the constitutional monarchy in 1834, the influence of the nobles decreased substantially. After Portugal became a republic in 1910, some Luso-Goan descendants of the nobility at Goa continued to bear their families' titles according to standards sustained by the Portuguese Institute of Nobility (Instituto da Nobreza Portuguesa), traditionally under the authority of the head of the formerly ruling House of Braganza.

Kochi
In Kochi, the first European settlement of India, the portuguese settled in areas like Mulavukad, Vypeen, Gothuruth and Fort Kochi. They inter married with the local Malayali population and children thus born were called mestiços (Dutch: Topasses). They spoke a creole language called Cochin Portuguese Creole. The Portuguese rule lasted for 150 years until the Dutch annexed Cochin. The Portuguese mestiços were allowed to remain under Dutch rule and even thrived during the subsequent British occupation and later independence. They have their own unique culture and dressing style and a cuisine which is heavily based on Portuguese cuisines. 

Luso-Indians now number about 40,000 in Kochi and is the main centre for Anglo-Indian affairs in Kerala. There are also Catholic families with Portuguese surnames in Kochi, Kannur, Tellicherry, Trivandrum and Calicut (no longer in Mahé). Among them English replaced Portuguese creole as their family language one, two or three generations ago, so they usually claim that they are Anglo-Indian (or Eurasian) instead of Portuguese, as would have been the case up to the 19th century.

Elsewhere

In the Coromandel Coast, Luso-Indians were generally known as Topasses. They were Catholics and spoke Portuguese Creole. When England began to rule in India, they began to speak English in place of the Portuguese and also anglicised their names. They are, now, part of the Eurasian community. In Negapatam, in 1883, there were 20 families that spoke Creole Portuguese. There are currently about 2000 people who speak Creole Portuguese in Damão while in Diu the language is nearly extinct. About 900 monolingual people currently speak Creole Portuguese in Korlai. 

In North India, Luso-Indians are only present in Kanpur. During 18th century Kanpur was an important Portuguese trade centre and had large Portuguese population which declined after colonization by British forces. Portuguese form the large ethnic group among Ethnic communities in Kanpur at present.

Bondashil, located in the Badarpur district of South Assam, had a Portuguese settlement of about 40 families
back in the 17th century. Other in Rangamati in Goalpara district of Assam and  Mariamnagar on the outskirts of Tripura’s capital Agartala.

Portuguese-speaking communities pre-independence British Raj India

Numerous Luso-Indians and Luso-Goans were based in large cities of the Raj with the majority in  Mumbai, and a smaller number in Karachi and other Indian cities. In the decades following the formation of Pakistan many Goan left for better economic opportunities in the West or the Persian Gulf countries. Many Anglo-Indians resided at Karachi as well and often married Luso-Asians. The descendants are part of a minority community and are Pakistani citizens and cannot visit their ancestral family homes at Goa post the 1961 Indian annexation of Goa with ease.

Luso-Indians, Luso-Goans outside the Republic of India
During Portuguese governance in parts of today's Republic of India, many Luso-Indian, Luso-Goan mestiços left the Indian subcontinent for other Portuguese territories and colonies for purposes of trade. Some also became Roman Catholic missionaries in Macau, Indonesia and Japan. One such mestiço was Gonsalo Garcia, a Catholic saint who was martyred in Japan in 1597. Other Luso-Indians went to Macau, then a Portuguese colony, where they intermarried into the local Macanese population. Goan mestiços are among the ancestors of many Macanese today. Before heading to Macau, Luso-Indians migrated to Malacca, Singapore, and Indonesia, where they intermarried with  Malay and other native settlers, and descendants of Chinese settlers. Still other Luso-Indians went to Portuguese Mozambique. Known members of the Luso-Indian Mozambican community are Otelo Saraiva de Carvalho, a leader of the Carnation Revolution against the Estado Novo in Portugal, and Orlando da Costa, a writer who was born in Mozambique and lived until the age of 18 in Goa.

During the days of the British empire, many Goans migrated to the British ruled regions in East Africa such as Kenya, and Uganda.
The mestiço children of wealthy Portuguese men were often sent to Portugal to study. Sometimes they remained there and established families. Many Portuguese-born mestiços became prominent politicians, lawyers, writers or celebrities. Alfredo Nobre da Costa, who was briefly Prime Minister of Portugal in 1978, was of partial Goan descent on his father's side. Similarly, António Costa, the Prime Minister of Portugal since  26 November 2015, is one-quarter Goan through his father, Orlando da Costa. Television presenter Catarina Furtado is also part Indian.

Following the 1961 Indian annexation of Goa, many ethnic Portuguese living in Goa, as well as Goan assimilados and mestiços or Luso-Indians fled Goa for Portugal, Brazil or Portuguese Africa, others continued to live in Goa which is under the statehood of the Republic of India.

Notable Luso-Indians & Luso-Goans

Significant Overlap with: List of people from Goa

 Suella Braverman – Home Secretary
 Vincent Conçessao, Archbishop of Delhi
 Antonio Costa, Prime Minister of Portugal
 Henry Louis Vivian Derozio – Indian teacher and poet (b. 1809)
 Juliana Dias da Costa – Harem-servant to the Mughal emperor of India Bahadur Shah I (b. 1658)
 Blasius D'Souza
 Cardinal Ivan Dias – Archbishop of Bombay
 Angelo Innocent Fernandes – Archbishop of Delhi
 Tony Fernandes – businessman
 Anthony Firingee – Bengali language folk poet (b. 1786)
 Gonsalo Garcia – Roman Catholic saint (b. 1556)
 John Gomes - Senior Vice President of Search, Google
 Cardinal Oswald Gracias – Archbishop of Bombay
 Cardinal Valerian Gracias – Archbishop of Bombay
Carol Gracias (Model)
 John Richard Lobo
 Michael Lobo
 Ivan Menezes – Chief Executive Officer of Diageo
 Manuel Menezes – Chairman of the Indian Railway Board
 Victor Menezes
 Casimiro Monteiro – PIDE agent who carried out the high-profile assassinations of Portuguese politicians, Humberto Delgado and Eduardo Mondlane (b. 1920)
Cardinal Simon Pimenta – Archbishop of Bombay
V.J.P. Saldanha
Maurice Salvador Sreshta
Fitz Remedios Santana de Souza
Keith Vaz – British Member of Parliament
Valerie Vaz – British Member of Parliament and Shadow Leader of the House of Commons
Ileana D'Cruz – Indian-born naturalised Portuguese actress
Miguel Vicente de Abreu – historian
Teotónio Rosário de Souza – historian
José Camillo Lisboa – physician and botanist

See also
 India–Portugal relations
 Portuguese India
 Indians in Portugal
 Korlai Fort
 List of topics on the Portuguese Empire in the East

References

 
India
 
Portuguese expatriates in India
Luso-Indian
Europeans in India